Ruiru is a municipality and sub-county in Kiambu County. It sits within the greater Nairobi Metropolitan region. According to the 2019 national population census, Ruiru is the 4th largest urban center in Kenya by population. The name Ruiru is of the Kikuyu dialect and possibly relates to the black cotton soil that is found in most parts of Ruiru to the East and South.

Location
The subcounty measures  and is connected to Nairobi by both road and rail. The geographical co-ordinates of Ruiru are: 1°10'04.0"S, 36°58'24.0"E (Latitude: −1.167778; Longitude: 36.973333).

History
This area was a sisal and coffee growing district with sisal on either side of the river to the right of the main road to Thika. As can be seen it is now a housing area. There used to be four main manager houses on the estate on the South side of the river. The area was given over to an African consortium to be developed into small holdings in the 1970s.

Prior to Kenya's independence, Ruiru was administered under the Nairobi City Council and was referred to as The Western Rural District. After independence, the area was put under the administration of the Kiambu County Council before being elevated to a town council in 1986. In 1997, Ruiru was upgraded to municipality status comprising nine elective wards namely Biashara, Gitothua, Gatongora, Kahawa Sukari, Githurai Kimbo, Jacaranda, Theta, Viwanda, and Murera.

The creation of the Nairobi Metropolitan Region (NMR) by an Executive Order in May 2008 put the town under its wider urban integrated plan.

Neighbourhoods

The expansive Ruiru municipality sprawl comprises many neighbourhoods including Ruiru Town, Tatu City, Kahawa, Githurai 45, Mwihoko, Membley, Kamakis, Varsity Ville, Northlands City among others.

Economy

Ruiru is also an industrial town with several major factories, including Devki Steel Mills, Super Foam Limited, Spinners & Spinners Garment Factory Ruiru mabati Factory and Ruiru Feeds Limited.

The Tatu City Industrial Park is also found within Ruiru and is home to tens of factories among them BIDCO, Copia, Dormans, Davis & Shirtliff, Tianlong, Stecol, Dr. Mattress among others.

The town is served by banks and shopping malls enjoys a housing boom, as many coffee estates are converted into residential areas, including an upcoming multi-billion Tatu Estate. Information and communication technology  businesses are also emerging, including SmartEdge PASHA Center, a digital village where the community can buy computers and find free computer training.

Several banks have opened their branches in Ruiru particularly on the Kamakis area and include NCBA, Sidian Bank, Diamond Trust Bank. Equity Bank, Co-operative Bank have branches in the Ruiru CBD.

Infrastructure projects
Ruiru is home to major government and private infrastructure developments among them Tatu City, a 5,000 acre mixed-use project. The proposed Northlands City project is also found in this area.

Prominent government-led infrastructure projects in Ruiru include the Ksh 2.5 Billion Ruiru Sewer Plant, the dualling of the Nairobi Eastern Bypass Highway, and the Nairobi commuter rail service project to mention but a few.

Population
In 2009, Ruiru's population was enumerated at 238,858 residents. Ten years later, the 2019 national census enumerated the population of the town at 490,120 making it the fourth largest urban center in Kenya by population.

The rapid population growth is attributable to several factors. One factor, is the shortage of affordable residential housing in Nairobi. Another factor being the infrastructure development especially Thika Road and Nairobi Eastern Bypass Highway. as well as the associated commercial and residential development that followed the new highways. A third factor is the presence of university campuses in or near Ruiru.

Education
Two universities have their main campuses in Ruiru namely Zetech University and Kiriri Women's University of Science and Technology, the Kenyatta University (Main and Ruiru Campuses) are also found within the vicinity of the municipality. The University of Nairobi and other institutions of higher education have campuses in or near Ruiru.

In July 2022, the President of the Republic of Kenya, Uhuru Kenyatta broke ground for yet another University in Ruiru known as the AMREF International University. The Health Science university will be hosted within the expansive Northlands City land found in the Southern wing of the chartered Ruiru Municipality area.

Politics 
Ruiru was originally part of the greater Juja Constituency until it was hived off and made into an independent electoral area the psychological boundary separating it from Juja constituency being the Ruiru river as it flows downstream to the confluence with the Nairobi River.

Hon Esther Gathogo was Member of Parliament from 2013 to 2017. Hon. Simon Ng'ang'a King'ara became the area's Member of Parliament after winning the August 2017 general elections.

References

External links
 Regional Development of Metropolitan Nairobi and the Ruiru Master Plan – Center for Sustainable Urban Development (archived from the Wayback Machine)

Kiambu County
Populated places in Central Province (Kenya)